Sultan Ghunaiman Al-Mutairi (born 13 September 1989) is a Saudi Arabian footballer who plays as a defender for Al-Qaisumah.

Honours
Al-Batin
MS League: 2019–20

External links

References

1989 births
Living people
Saudi Arabian footballers
Al-Shabab FC (Riyadh) players
Al Batin FC players
Al-Jabalain FC players
Al-Qaisumah FC players
Saudi Second Division players
Saudi First Division League players
Saudi Professional League players
Association football defenders